John Johns Trigg (1748May 17, 1804) was an American farmer and politician from Bedford County, Virginia, United States. He fought with the Virginia militia in the Revolutionary War and represented Virginia in the U.S. Congress from 1797 until 1804. He was a slaveholder.

Life

Family life
John was born on his father's farm near New London in Lunenburg County (now Bedford County) in the Colony of Virginia. He was one of the eight children of  William Trigg (1716 – 1773) and Mary (Johns) Trigg (1720 – 1773). His father, William served as a judge in Bedford County (which was formed from part of Lunenburg County in 1754) for many years. His brother, Abram, would serve with him in congress. The Trigg and Johns families both arrived in Virginia from England in the mid-seventeenth century.  The Triggs were from Cornwall.

John married Dianna Ayers on December 17, 1770, and they settled on their own plantation "Old Liberty" near what became the town of Liberty (now Bedford, Virginia). The family would grow to include seven children: Stephen, William, Nancy, Daniel, Theodosia, John Johns Jr., and Mary (Polly). Dianna survived John, living until some time after 1807.

Military service
Virginia expanded her militia as the conflict with Great Britain loomed. Trigg raised a new militia company in Bedford County in 1775 and led it as its lieutenant. He remained with this unit throughout the war, and saw several local actions. The state's House of Delegates named him as a captain on March 23, 1778, and a major in 1781. He was a major of artillery at the Siege of Yorktown later that year, and was present at the surrender of Lord Cornwallis.

After the war Trigg continued his service in the Virginia militia. He was promoted to lieutenant colonel in 1791, and in 1793 served as a major in the Second Battalion of the Tenth Regiment of the Virginia militia. In 1796 and 1802, he was commander of the 91st Regiment of the Virginia militia.

Political career
Trigg's political service started around 1781 when he became a Justice of the Peace in Bedford County. He was elected to represent the county in the Virginia House of Delegates, and served there from 1784 until 1792. In 1788 he represented Bedford County in the Virginia Convention that ratified the U.S. Constitution. Trigg voted with Patrick Henry and the Antifederalists against ratification. He served in the Virginia Senate from 1792 until 1796.

He was elected in the United States House of Representatives in 1796 as a Jeffersonian Republican. Trigg was re-elected three times, and served in the Congress from 1797. He died at home on May 17, 1804, on his farm near Liberty in Bedford County and was buried in a family plot there.

The Fifth Congress
Trigg arrived on the second day the Fifth Congress of the United States convened, Tuesday, May 16, 1797, and was in time to hear the new President's speech to Congress about his position in regards to France. At this time, Trigg, a Democratic-Republican/Anti-Federalist was in the minority party, as the House was majority Federalist, as was John Adams, the President of the United States. After the President's speech, which caused an uproar among Anti-Federalists as not being sympathetic enough to France and too hawkish, the House debated until May 31 on their response to his address. Their response, with an amendment, basically supported the President's speech. Trigg voted against the response, while his brother Abram voted for it.

Other votes during this session:
 Yea: June 24 - "An act providing a Naval Armament"
 Nay: July 3 - Stamp Duties
 Nay: July 5 - Duty on Salt

When the second session for this Congress returned in November, Trigg arrived three days late on November 16, 1797.

Votes during this session:
 Nay: May 18 - Establishing a Provisional Army

Electoral history
1797; Trigg was elected to the U.S. House of Representatives unopposed.
1799; Trigg was re-elected with 98.31% of the vote, defeating Federalist George Hancock.
1801; Trigg was re-elected unopposed.

See also
 List of United States Congress members who died in office (1790–1899)

Notes

External links
biographic sketch at U.S. Congress website

1748 births
1804 deaths
Delegates to the Virginia Ratifying Convention
18th-century American politicians
Members of the Virginia House of Delegates
Virginia militiamen in the American Revolution
American people of Cornish descent
Virginia state senators
Democratic-Republican Party members of the United States House of Representatives from Virginia